Well.ca is a Canadian e-commerce retailer based in Guelph, Ontario that specializes in health, beauty, baby, home, and green and natural products. The company was founded in 2008 by Ali Asaria.

In December 2017, pharmaceutical company McKesson Canada acquired Well.ca.

History
In 2008, Well.ca was created after founder Ali Asaria decided to try online selling of products from his father's pharmacy. The company now has over 100 employees in offices in Guelph and Toronto and sells over 40,000 different products online.

In 2013, Rebecca McKillican became Well.ca's new CEO after founder and previous CEO Ali Asaria stepped down from his role to focus on a new venture.

Products and services
In 2015, Well.ca opened its first brick-and-mortar shop, located at the Shops at Don Mills, with the initial intention of remaining open for four months. Online sales information would be used to determine the selection of products for the store.

Awards and recognition
Well.ca has received Canada Post E-Commerce Innovation awards in 2012, 2013, 2015, 2016 and 2019 The company was named Best Mid-Size E-Commerce Retailer in 2013 by the Retail Council of Canada, and created one of Canada's first Virtual Store experiences in 2012 at Union Station in Toronto. Forrester awarded Well.ca a tie for the top spot on its Canadian Customer Experience Index.

References

External links

 
 Health and Beauty website

Online retailers of Canada
Canadian companies established in 2008
Companies based in Guelph